Tchagen Airport  is a public use airport located near Tchagen, Tandjilé, Chad.

See also
List of airports in Chad

References

External links 
 Airport record for Tchagen Airport at Landings.com

Airports in Chad
Tandjilé Region